Sean Rea (born May 15, 2002) is a Canadian professional soccer player who plays as a forward for Major League Soccer club CF Montréal.

Early life
Rea began playing soccer at age four with Saint-Léonard. In 2014, he joined the Montreal Impact Academy. In January 2020, he traveled to Italy to train with Pescara, and Germany where he spent almost two weeks with Schalke.

Club career
In December 2020, he signed his first professional contract with the Montreal Impact (later re-named CF Montreal) of Major League Soccer. He served as an unused substitute in their CONCACAF Champions League match against C.D. Olimpia on December 15, 2020.

In April 2021, he went on loan with Valour FC of the Canadian Premier League, after turning down an opportunity to join an Italian Serie C club on loan. On June 27, 2021, Rea made his professional debut for Valour as a starter in the opening match of the season against Forge FC. He scored his first professional goal on August 21, 2021 in a Canadian Championship match against Atlético Ottawa. After the 2021 season, CF Montreal picked up his club option for 2022.

In March 2022, he returned to Valour FC on a new loan. He was named the CPL Player of the Month for August 2022 and was named to the CPL Team of the Week six times, over the course of the season. In his second season with the club, he led the team in minutes played, doubling his amount from the previous season, and set a CPL record with 9 assists. He also led the league in chances created (71) and in completed crosses and corners (62). After the season, he was named the 2022 CPL U21 Player of the Year and was nominated for the league Player of the Year and the Players' Player Award.

Rea made his competitive debut for Montreal in their 2023 season-opener against Inter Miami on February 25, entering as a substitute in an eventual 2-0 defeat.

International career
At international level, Rea is eligible to represent both the Canadian and Italian national teams.

In November 2016, he debuted in the Canadian national program, attending a national U14 camp. In 2017, he was named to the Canada U15 team for the 2017 CONCACAF Boys' Under-15 Championship. He scored his first international goal on August 14 against Costa Rica U15.

In 2017, Rea was named to the Canada U17 team for the 2019 FIFA U-17 World Cup.

Personal life
Rea has Italian heritage and is a fan of Serie A club Napoli.

He holds an Italian passport through his grandfather, who emigrated from Italy to Canada.

Career statistics

Honours

Individual
Canadian Premier League Best Under 21 Canadian Player of the Year: 2022

References

External links

2002 births
Living people
Association football forwards
Canadian soccer players
Soccer players from Montreal
Sportspeople from Laval, Quebec
People from LaSalle, Quebec
CF Montréal players
Valour FC players
Canadian Premier League players
Canada men's youth international soccer players
Homegrown Players (MLS)
FC St-Léonard players
Major League Soccer players